Tillandsia leiboldiana is a species of flowering plant in the genus Tillandsia. This species is native to Central America and Mexico.

Cultivars
 Tillandsia 'Chevalieri'

References

leiboldiana
Flora of Central America
Flora of Mexico
Plants described in 1845